Gatra (stylized in all caps) is a weekly news magazine published in Jakarta, Indonesia. It is one of the two principal news magazines in the country, the other being Tempo.

Gatra was founded in 1994. The magazine has its headquarters in Jakarta. It provides articles on news and is published on a weekly basis.

References

External links
Official site 

1994 establishments in Indonesia
News magazines published in Asia
Political magazines published in Indonesia
Indonesian-language magazines
Magazines established in 1994
Magazines published in Jakarta
Weekly news magazines